Asunción Acosta Galano (born 10 May 1954) is a Cuban sprinter. She competed in the women's 400 metres at the 1972 Summer Olympics. She won a bronze medal in the 4 x 400 metres relay at the 1975 Pan American Games.

References

External links

1954 births
Living people
Athletes (track and field) at the 1972 Summer Olympics
Cuban female sprinters
Olympic athletes of Cuba
Pan American Games bronze medalists for Cuba
Pan American Games medalists in athletics (track and field)
Athletes (track and field) at the 1975 Pan American Games
Competitors at the 1974 Central American and Caribbean Games
Central American and Caribbean Games silver medalists for Cuba
Central American and Caribbean Games bronze medalists for Cuba
Place of birth missing (living people)
Central American and Caribbean Games medalists in athletics
Medalists at the 1975 Pan American Games
Olympic female sprinters
20th-century Cuban women
20th-century Cuban people
21st-century Cuban women